Liparis, commonly known as widelip orchids, sphinx orchids or 羊耳蒜属 (yang er suan shu) is a cosmopolitan genus of more than 350 species of orchids in the family Orchidaceae. Plants in this genus are terrestrial, lithophytic or epiphytic herbs with a wide range of forms. The flowers are usually resupinate and small to medium sized, yellow, yellow-green or purplish with spreading sepals and petals. The labellum is usually larger than the sepals and petals and is lobed, sometimes with a toothed or wavy margin and one or two calli at its base.

Description
Orchids in the genus Liparis are terrestrial, lithophytic or epiphytic herbs, usually with one to a few leaves which may be linear to egg-shaped, thin or leathery and sometimes pleated. The flowers are small to medium sized, resupinate and arranged on a flowering stem with small bracts. The flowers are usually dull yellow, yellow-green or purplish and often have an unpleasant odour. The sepals and petals turn downwards and the dorsal sepal is free but the lateral sepals are sometimes fused for at least part of their length. The petals are free from each other and often different in size and shape from the sepals. The labellum is usually larger than both the sepals and petals, often lobed with a toothed or wavy edge and one or two calli at its base. There are two pairs of waxy, oval pollinia, each with a viscidium.

Taxonomy and naming
The genus Liparis was first formally described in 1817 by Louis Claude Richard and the description was published in  Die Orchideis Europaeis Annotationes. The name Liparis is from the Ancient Greek word liparos meaning "oily", "greasy", "sleek" or "shiny", referring to the smooth leaves.

Distribution
Species of Liparis occur on every continent except Antarctica. They are found in tropical Asia, subtropical and tropical parts of the Americas, Africa, New Guinea and Australia. There are sixty three species in China, twenty of which are endemic to that country, two in North America and one in Europe.

Selected species
 
Liparis angustilabris (F.Muell.) Blaxell – Queensland
Liparis bautingensis Tang & F.T.Wang – China
Liparis bracteata  T.E.Hunt – Queensland
Liparis coelogynoides (F.Muell.) Benth. – N.S.W., Qld.
Liparis condylobulbon Rchb.f. – Taiwan, Indochina to south-west Pacific
Liparis crenulata (Blume) Lindl. – Indonesia
Liparis elegans Lindl. – Indonesia, New Guinea
Liparis fissipetala Finet – China
Liparis fleckeri Nicholls – Qld.
Liparis goodyeroides Schltr. – Africa
Liparis habenarina (F.Muell.) F.Muell. ex Benth. – Australia
Liparis hawaiensis (Blume) Lindl. – Hawaiian Islands
Liparis hostifolia (Koidz.) Koidz. ex Nakai – Japan
Liparis latifolia Lindl. – China, Southeast Asia, the Philippines, New Guinea
Liparis liliifolia (L.) Rich. ex Lindl. – North America
Liparis loeselii  (L.) Rich. – Europe, Asia, North America
Liparis nervosa (Thunb.) Lindl. – Asia, Africa, America
Liparis nugentiae F.M.Bailey – Qld.
Liparis petricola (D.L.Jones & B.Gray) Bostock – Qld.
Liparis pingxiangensis L.Li & H.F.Yan – China
Liparis reflexa (R.Br.) Lindl. – N.S.W.
Liparis sanamalabarica P.M.Salim – India
Liparis simmondsii F.M.Bailey – Qld.
Liparis swenssonii F.M.Bailey – N.S.W., Qld.

References

External links
 

 
Malaxideae genera
Orchids of Europe
Orchids of Asia
Orchids of North America
Orchids of South America
Flora of the Caribbean
Orchids of Africa
Orchids of Australia
Orchids of China
Orchids of India
Taxonomy articles created by Polbot
Epiphytes